The Château du Ranroët is a castle existing since the 12th century, located in Herbignac in the Loire-Atlantique department of France.

Since 1925, the Château du Ranroët has been listed as a monument historique by the French Ministry of Culture.

See also 
 List of castles in France

References

External links

 Château de Ranrouët at Commune of Herbignac official website 

Ruined castles in Pays de la Loire
Châteaux in Loire-Atlantique
Monuments historiques of Pays de la Loire